Aleksei Nikolayevich Zlydnev (born 23 May 1980) is a Russian former professional footballer.

Club career
He made his professional debut in the Russian Third Division in 1997 for FC Spartak-d Moscow. He played 2 games for the main squad of FC Uralan Elista in the Russian Premier League Cup.

Honours
 Russian Premier League champion: 1999.
 Russian Cup winner: 1998.
 Russian Cup finalist: 2003 (played in the early stages of the 2002/03 tournament for FC Rostselmash Rostov-on-Don).

References

1980 births
Sportspeople from Smolensk
Living people
Russian footballers
Russia under-21 international footballers
Association football midfielders
FC Spartak Moscow players
FC Rostov players
FC Elista players
FC Oryol players
FC Akhmat Grozny players
Russian Premier League players
FC Spartak-2 Moscow players